ICBRR stands for Integrated Community Based Risk Reduction Program. It is a program currently being implemented in Indonesia, funded by the International Federation Red Cross (IFRC) and in cooperation with the Danish Red Cross (DRC) and Indonesian Red Cross Society (PMI). It is being conducted in 11 branches in Central Java and Yogyakarta. Six branches in Central Java are Klaten, Magelang, Boyolali, Temanggung, Purowrejo and Karanganyar. 5 branches in Yogyakarta consist of Kota Yogyakarta, Bantul, Sleman, Gunung Kidul and Kulon Progo.

The program started by making a program document and MoU between IFRC, DRC and PMI. The objective of the program is to strengthen the capacity of the community in facing disasters by reducing the risk and strengthening the capacity of PMI to assist with in the communities in response to a disaster.

See also
 Indonesian Red Cross Society

Notes
 Palang Merah Indonesia and integrated community based risk reduction

References

Emergency management in Indonesia
Central Java